Portogloboviridae is a family of DNA viruses that infect archaea. It is a proposed family of the realm Varidnaviria. Viruses in the family are related to Halopanivirales. The capsid proteins of these viruses and their characteristics are of evolutionary importance for the origin of the other Varidnaviria viruses since they seem to retain primordial characters.

Description
The virions in this family have a capsid with icosahedral geometry and a viral envelope that protects the genetic material. The diameter is 83 to 87 nanometers. The genome is circular and of double-stranded DNA with a length of 20,222 base pairs. The genome contains 45 open reading frames (ORFs), which are closely arranged and occupy 89.1% of the genome. ORFs are generally short, with an average length of 103 codons. Virions have 10 proteins ranging from 20 to 32 kDa. Of these proteins, 8 code for the capsid and two for the viral envelope, including one that is a vertical single jelly roll (SJR) capsid protein.  Entry into the host cell is by penetration. Viral replication occurs by chronic infection without a lytic cycle.

The Portogloboviridae viruses together with Halopanivirales have evolutionary importance in the evolution of the other Varidnaviria viruses since they appear to be relics of how the first viruses of this realm were. Portogloboviridae together with Halopanivirales may have infected the last universal common ancestor (LUCA) and originated before that organism.

It has been proposed that it may be related to the origin of Varidnaviria in the following way.

Taxonomy
The family has one genus which has two species:
 Alphaportoglobovirus
 Alphaportoglobovirus SPV2
 Sulfolobus alphaportoglobovirus 1

Notes

References

DNA viruses